Pedro Luís e a Parede (lit. "Pedro Luis and the Wall") are a Brazilian musical group that mixes rock, samba, rap and funk. the group is composed by Pedro Luís (lead vocals and acoustic guitar), Mário Moura (bass guitar), Sidon Silva, C.A. Ferrari and Celso Alvim (all three do the percussion).

Discography 
 1997 – Astronauta Tupy - Dubas/WEA
 1999 - É Tudo 1 Real - WEA
 2001 - Zona e Progresso - Universal Music/MP,B
 2004 - Vagabundo - Universal Music
 2008 - Ponto Enredo - EMI

Compilations
 2006 - Seleção 1997-2004 - Universal/MP,B

References 
 [ Pedro Luís e a Parede] at allmusic

Musical groups established in 1996
Brazilian rock music groups
Samba ensembles
Música popular brasileira musical groups
1996 establishments in Brazil